Germany competed at the 2004 Summer Paralympics in Athens, Greece. The team included 212 athletes—140 men and 72 women. German competitors won 78 medals, 19 gold, 28 silver and 31 bronze, to finish 8th in the medal table.

Medallists

Sports

Archery

Men

|-
|align=left|Eric Hassberg
|align=left|Men's individual W1
|606
|7
|
|W 150-150 #1
|L 102-102 #2
|colspan=3|did not advance
|-
|align=left|Hermann Nortman
|align=left|Men's individual W2
|593
|17
|L 145-147
|colspan=5|did not advance
|-
|align=left|Mario Oehme
|align=left|Men's individual W2
|625
|3
|W 159-135
|W 150-139
|W 100-100 #3
|W 98-97
|W 108-95
|
|-
|align=left|Eric Hassberg Hermann Nortmann Mario Oehme
|align=left|Men's team
|1824
|6
|
|L 221-229
|colspan=4|did not advance
|}

1 - Eric Hassberg's round of 16 was decided by additional arrows against Aaron Cross. He won 9:8

2 - Eric Hassberg's quarterfinal was decided by additional arrows against Anders Groenberg. He lost 9:9, 8:8, 8:X.

3 - Mario Oehme's quarterfinal was decided by additional arrows against Muhamad Salam Sidik. He won 8:5.

Women

|-
|align=left|Maria Droste
|align=left|Women's individual W1/W2
|544
|10
|
|L 120-141
|colspan=5|did not advance
|}

Athletics

Men's track

Men's field

Women's track

Women's field

Cycling

Men's road

Men's track (individual)

Men's track (pairs/teams)

Women's road

Women's track

Equestrian

Individual

Team

Goalball

Men's tournament
The men's goalball team didn't win any medals: they were 10th out of 12 teams.

Players
Thomas Betzl
Michael Breidbach
Johann Demmelhuber
Mathias Koehler
Steffen Lehmann
Matthias Schmidt

Results

Women's tournament
The women's goalball team didn't win any medals. They were 6th out of 8 teams.

Players
Cornelia Dietz
Ina Fischer
Veronika Matthieu
Christiane Moeller
Christa Pekx
Regina Vollbrecht

Results

Judo

Men

Women

Powerlifting

Sailing

Shooting

Men

Women

Swimming

Men

Women

Table tennis

Men's singles

Men's teams

Women's singles

Volleyball
The men's volleyball team didn't win any medals: they lost to Egypt in the bronze medal match.

Players
Steffen Barsch
Jens Faerber
Robert Grylak
Uwe Haussig
Benjamin Paolo Oesch
Thomas Renger
Martin Rickmann
Mario Scheler
Alexander Schiffler
Juergen Schrapp
Siegmund Soicke
Stefan Wischnewski

Results

Wheelchair basketball

Men's tournament
The men's basketball team didn't win any medals: they were 5th out of 12 teams.

Players
Lars Christink
Ben Doering
Thomas Fischer
Markus Haberkorn
Sebastian Hagen Wolf
Joerg Hilger
Abdulqazi Karaman
Lars Lehmann
Martin Otto
Joachim Peter Schermuly
Ralf Schwarz
Dirk Thalheim

Results

Women's tournament
The women's basketball team didn't win any medals: they lost to Canada in the bronze medal match.

Players
Maren Bartlitz
Silke Bleifuss
Anja Janusch
Annette Kahl
Verena Klein
Heidi Kriste
Simone Kues
Birgit Meitner
Inga Orlowski
Nora Schratz
Nu Nguyen Thi
Annika Zeyen

Results

Wheelchair fencing

Men

Women

Teams

Wheelchair rugby
The men's rugby team didn't win any medals: they were 7th out of 8 teams.

Players
Hans Bach
Joerg Holzem
Bernd Janssen
Andre Leonhard
Wolfgang Mayer
Nacer Menezla
Oliver Johannes Picht
Peter Schreiner
Juergen Schmid
Christoph Werner
Dirk Wieschendorf

Results

Wheelchair tennis

Men

Women

See also
Germany at the Paralympics
Germany at the 2004 Summer Olympics

References 

Nations at the 2004 Summer Paralympics
2004
Summer Paralympics